

France
 Afars and Issas
 Commissioner – 
 Georges Thiercy, High Commissioner of the Afars and Issas (1971–1974)
 Christian Dablanc, High Commissioner of the Afars and Issas (1974–1976)
 Governing Council – Ali Aref Bourhan, President of the Governing Council (1967–1976)

Portugal
 Angola – 
 Fernando Augusto Santos e Castro, High Commissioner of Angola (1972–1974)
 Joaquín Franco Pinheiro, High Commissioner of Angola (1974)
 Silvino Silvério Marquês, High Commissioner of Angola (1974)
 António Alva Rosa Coutinho, High Commissioner of Angola (1974–1975)

United Kingdom
 Hong Kong – 
Lord MacLehose of Beoch, Governor of Hong Kong (1971–1982)

Colonial governors
Colonial governors
1974